Javor (Serbian Cyrillic: Јавор) is a mountain in southwestern Serbia, between towns of Sjenica and Ivanjica. Its highest peak, Vasilin vrh, has an elevation of 1,519 meters above sea level.

See also
 Memorial Cemetery (Javor)

References

External links

Mountains of Serbia